Gino Trambaiolo (born 3 January 1951) is a former Italian male long-distance runner who competed at one edition of the IAAF World Cross Country Championships at senior level (1975),

References

External links
 Gino Trambaiolo profile at Association of Road Racing Statisticians

1951 births
Living people
Italian male long-distance runners
Italian male cross country runners